An Air Experience Flight (AEF) is a training unit of the Royal Air Force Volunteer Reserve (Training Branch) whose main purpose is to give introductory flying experience to cadets from the Air Training Corps and the Combined Cadet Force. As of 2019, thirteen AEFs are active.

History
The AEFs, numbered from 1 to 13, were formed across the United Kingdom in 1958, all but two forming on the same day, 8 September. All were equipped with the de Havilland Canada DHC-1 Chipmunk T.10 trainer. An exception was No. 5 AEF, which also operated a single Beagle Husky (XW635) from 1969 to 1989.

In the mid-1990s they were merged with co-located University Air Squadrons (UASs), the Chipmunks being replaced by the existing UAS Scottish Aviation Bulldog T.1s.  No. 13 AEF at RAF Aldergrove was disbanded in 1996.  In 1999, the Grob Tutor T.1 began to replace the Bulldog.

On 10 March 2016, Julian Brazier, Parliamentary Under-Secretary (Ministry of Defence), announced the return of 13 AEF and a new 14 AEF.

Role and operations 
The Royal Air Force (RAF) Air Experience Flights (AEF) are co-located with University Air Squadron (UAS) units; the co-located AEF and UAS units pool resources and share aircraft.  Air Experience Flights provide basic flying experience, and aerobatics to eligible members of Royal Air Force Air Cadets (RAFAC), otherwise known as the Air Training Corps (ATC), along with the RAF section of the Combined Cadet Force (CCF-RAF), and other air-minded youth groups such as Air Scouts and the Girls Venture Corps Air Cadets (GVC-AC).

When two separate AEFs are co-located at the same airfield, such as No. 9 Air Experience Flight ( 9AEF) and No. 11 Air Experience Flight (11 AEF) at RAF Leeming, the two individual AEFs share the same fleet of aircraft.  Just like the University Air Squadrons, all Air Experience Flights are currently commanded by No. 6 Flying Training School RAF (6 FTS).

Current flights
No. 1 Air Experience Flight RAF – MoD St Athan
No. 2 Air Experience Flight RAF – MoD Boscombe Down
No. 3 Air Experience Flight RAF – Colerne Airfield
No. 4 Air Experience Flight RAF – Glasgow Airport
No. 5 Air Experience Flight RAF – RAF Wittering
No. 6 Air Experience Flight RAF – RAF Benson
No. 7 Air Experience Flight RAF – RAF Cranwell
No. 8 Air Experience Flight RAF – RAF Cosford
No. 9 Air Experience Flight RAF – RAF Leeming
No. 10 Air Experience Flight RAF – RAF Woodvale
No. 11 Air Experience Flight RAF – RAF Leeming
No. 12 Air Experience Flight RAF – Leuchars Station
No. 13 Air Experience Flight RAF – JHC FS Aldergrove
No. 14 Air Experience Flight RAF – TBA

Aircraft

Previously operated:
Scottish Aviation Bulldog T.1
Beagle Husky
de Havilland Canada DHC-1 Chipmunk T.10

References

External links
 RAF Air Experience Flights

 *
Royal Air Force
Air Cadet organisations
British Cadet organisations
Youth organisations based in the United Kingdom